Harry Carlyle Liscombe (May 17, 1914 – February 24, 2004) was a Canadian ice hockey player. He played in the National Hockey League with the Detroit Red Wings between 1937 and 1946. With Detroit he won the Stanley Cup in 1943. He also won the Calder Cup with the Providence Reds of the American Hockey League in 1949. Liscombe was the last surviving member of Red Wings 1943 Stanley Cup team.

Playing career
Liscombe was a key member of the 1943 Stanley Cup champions. After scoring 42 points during the regular season, he tied a league record with 14 points in the playoffs. He scored the last goal of the 1943 Stanley Cup Final.

After co-leading the NHL across two playoff seasons with 26 points (12 points in 1942 and 14 points in 1943), Liscombe scored a career-high 73 points in 50 games during the 1943-44 regular season (fourth-best in the league scoring race).

Liscombe shares the team record for most goals in a playoff game and most points in a game.

Liscombe was also a star in the American Hockey League, notably becoming the first back-to-back winner of the Les Cunningham Award as the league's Most Valuable Player. In 1949, Liscombe helped the Providence Reds win the Calder Cup.

Liscombe died of complications from leukemia.

Career statistics

Regular season and playoffs

Awards and achievements
Was winner of two AHL most valuable player awards;
 1948 Les Cunningham Award winner  (Providence)
 1949 Les Cunningham Award winner  (Providence)

References

External links

1914 births
2004 deaths
Canadian expatriate ice hockey players in the United States
Canadian ice hockey left wingers
Deaths from cancer in Hawaii
Deaths from leukemia
Detroit Hettche players
Detroit Olympics (IHL) players
Detroit Red Wings players
Ice hockey people from Ontario
Indianapolis Capitals players
Ontario Hockey Association Senior A League (1890–1979) players
People from Perth, Ontario
Pittsburgh Hornets players
Providence Reds players
St. Louis Flyers players
Stanley Cup champions